Brigadier-General Stuart Peter Rolt  (29 July 1862 – 8 May 1933) was a British Army officer who became Commandant of the Royal Military College, Sandhurst.

Military career
Stuart Rolt was the son of Peter Rolt, a Conservative Member of Parliament. He was commissioned into the York and Lancaster Regiment as a lieutenant on 30 January 1884, promoted to captain on 28 April 1890, and saw service in the Second Boer War, commanding the Rhodesia Regiment, where he was wounded in action. Promotion to major came while in South Africa, on 21 February 1900, followed by promotion to the brevet rank of lieutenant-colonel on 29 November 1900. After his return to the United Kingdom, he was appointed an Assistant Inspector of Gymnasia at Aldershot on 5 February 1901.

In 1911 he was appointed to command of 14th Infantry Brigade, in 5th Division; when the First World War broke out in July 1914, he took it to France as part of the British Expeditionary Force.

14th Brigade saw heavy action in the early stages of the war, being almost constantly engaged in combat for two months. In October, he was recalled from command on the grounds of exhaustion – though the corps commander was at pains to note that no stigma was to be placed on this move, and that he had in no way failed. He did not receive a new field command, but was instead became Commandant of the Royal Military College Sandhurst until August 1916, when he was appointed to command 170th Brigade in the 57th Division, a position he held until it was sent overseas. He retired in December 1918.

Personal life and family

Stuart Peter Rolt married Evelyn Roylance Court, daughter of William Roylance Court and Mary Carlaw Walker, in 1912. They had four children, Pamela Rolt, Suzanne Phyllis Rolt, Sybil Mary Rolt and Tony Rolt, later a racing driver.

References

 

1862 births
1933 deaths
People from Marylebone
British Army generals of World War I
British military personnel of the Second Boer War
British colonial army officers
Commandants of Sandhurst
York and Lancaster Regiment officers
Companions of the Order of the Bath
British Army personnel of the Second Boer War
Military personnel from Middlesex
British Army brigadiers